The North American Soccer League may refer to:

North American Soccer League (1968–1984), a former Division I league
North American Soccer League (2011–2017), a former Division II league